Jonas Cheruiyot (born 11 January 1984) is a Kenyan long-distance runner who specializes in the 5000 metres.

Achievements

Personal bests
3000 metres - 7:34.37 min (2007)
5000 metres - 12:59.08 min (2006)

External links

1984 births
Living people
Kenyan male long-distance runners